Culture Collection may refer to:

Culture Collection, University of Gothenburg, Sweden
Culture Collection of the Catholic University of Pernambuco

See also
Microbiological culture 
World Federation for Culture Collections
Microbial Culture Collection, Pune, India
European Culture Collections' Organisation
SERI microalgae culture collection
American Type Culture Collection
HPA Culture Collections
ARS Culture Collection (NRRL)